Taheri may refer to:
Siraf, formerly Taheri, a city in Iran
Taheri, Hormozgan, a village in Iran
Mohammad Ali Taheri (b. 1957), alternative medicines researcher
Amir Taheri (b. 1942), Iranian author and activist
Hossein Taheri (1941–2010), Iranian politician
Jalal Al-Din Taheri, Iranian cleric
Mohammad Taheri (b. 1985), Iranian futsal player
Mohammed Taheri, Iranian diplomat
Mohammad Sadegh Taheri, Iranian footballer

See also
Tahiri (disambiguation)